The Trotsky is a 2009 Canadian comedy film directed and written by Jacob Tierney and starring Jay Baruchel, Emily Hampshire, Colm Feore, Saul Rubinek, and Michael Murphy.

Plot

High School student Leon Bronstein believes that he is the reincarnation of the socialist revolutionary Leon Trotsky, whose birth name was Bronstein. Shortly after he starts to work in his family's clothing factory, he attempts to unionize the workplace with such actions as a hunger strike. He is pulled from his upper-class private school by his father and sent to the public school system. The school is run by the strong-willed principal Mr. Berkhoff and overly disciplinarian vice-principal Mrs. Davis. On the first day on school Leon witnesses given students detentions for minor offences. After school he joins the detained students in solidarity.  Meanwhile, he seeks romance with an older law school graduate student, Alexandra.

Cast

 Jay Baruchel as Leon Bronstein, a 17-year-old high school student
 Domini Blythe as Mrs. Davis, Leon's vice-principal
 Geneviève Bujold as Denise Archambault
 Anne-Marie Cadieux as Anna Bronstein, Leon's loving stepmother
 Jesse Camacho as Skip, Leon's school friend, Sarah's (eventual) boyfriend
 Colm Feore as Principal Henry Berkhoff
 Emily Hampshire as Alexandra Leith, new law school graduate, Leon's (eventual) 27-year-old girlfriend
 David Julian Hirsh as Eli, Leon's married brother
 Tiio Horn as Caroline, Leon's school friend
 Ricky Mabe as Tony, Leon's school friend
 Michael Murphy as Frank McGovern
 Jessica Paré as Laura, Alexandra's friend 
 Tommie-Amber Pirie as Sarah Bronstein, Leon's younger sister
 Saul Rubinek as David Bronstein, Leon's father

As part of the plot, Ben Mulroney plays himself, the host of etalk, interviewing "Leon Bronstein".

Production
Shooting for the film began in Montreal on 27 August 2008 at Lakeside Academy.

Release
The film was first previewed at the Toronto International Film Festival 11 September 2009. In the United States, it was screened at the 2010 Tribeca Film Festival. Its general Canadian release was on 14 May 2010.

Reception

Critical response
The Trotsky received mostly favorable reviews from critics. The Toronto Star gave The Trotsky a positive review, particularly of the cast. Another positive review from Montreal's The Gazette noted the "inspired, often-dangerously-funny screenplay" of the "too-talented" Tierney, likening the film to Ferris Bueller's Day Off.

On review aggregation website Rotten Tomatoes the film has a rating of 79% based on 14 reviews, with an average rating of 6.9/10.

Box office
The Trotsky grossed $440,000, against a production budget of C$6.4 million.

References

External links
 
 
 The Trotsky at Metacritic

2009 films
2009 comedy films
English-language Canadian films
Canadian political comedy films
Cultural depictions of Leon Trotsky
Films about communism
Films directed by Jacob Tierney
Films set in Montreal
Films shot in Montreal
2000s English-language films
2000s Canadian films